I, the Other (also known as Me, The Other) is a 2007 Italian drama film about two fishermen, directed by Mohsen Melliti. The film won three Italian Golden Globes, for best first work, best actor (to Raoul Bova), and best cinematography.

Cast

Plot
Giuseppe (Raoul Bova) and Yousef (Giovanni Martorana) are two fishermen bound by a long friendship. Giuseppe, an Italian, and Yousef, an Arab, both work together on the same boat. Out at sea, the two share everything, even the same first name.

One day, Giuseppe hears a disturbing report on the ship's radio. The report is a warning about a suspected terrorist who happens to have the same name as Giuseppe's trusted partner: Yousef Ben Ali. Giuseppe suspects that he is being double-crossed by his once faithful friend.

A cat-and-mouse game ensues, as the two try to outwit each other aboard the ship, alone in the middle of the sea.

Filming location
The entire film was filmed off the coast of Ponza, the largest of the Pontine Islands.

See also 
 Movies about immigration to Italy

References

External links 
 

2006 films
2006 drama films
2000s Italian-language films
Films set in Italy
Films about immigration
Italian drama films
2000s Italian films